María Eugenia Villamizar Amado (born 30 August 1970) is a retired Colombian athlete who specialised in the hammer throw. She dominated the event on regional level in the 1990s.

Her personal best throw is 59.86 metres, set in Bogotá in 2002.

She also competed in weightlifting.

Competition record

References

1970 births
Living people
Sportspeople from Santander Department
Colombian female hammer throwers
Colombian female weightlifters
South American Games gold medalists for Colombia
South American Games medalists in athletics
Athletes (track and field) at the 1995 Pan American Games
Competitors at the 1998 South American Games
Central American and Caribbean Games silver medalists for Colombia
Competitors at the 1998 Central American and Caribbean Games
Competitors at the 2002 Central American and Caribbean Games
Central American and Caribbean Games medalists in athletics
Pan American Games competitors for Colombia
20th-century Colombian women
21st-century Colombian women
Pan American Games silver medalists for Colombia
Pan American Games medalists in athletics (track and field)
Medalists at the 1995 Pan American Games